Fieferana is a rural commune in Analamanga Region, in the  Central Highlands of Madagascar. It belongs to the district of Antananarivo Avaradrano and its populations numbers to 7,068 in 2018. It is located at a distance of 23 km from Antananarivo.

Economy
The economy of this commune is based on agriculture.  Rice, corn, manioc, beans, potatoes and vegetrables are the main products.

References

Populated places in Analamanga